Osmund Ueland (born 27 September 1947) is a Norwegian civil servant and former CEO of Norges Statsbaner (NSB).

An engineer by education, he worked for Aker from 1975 to 1990. From 1990 to 1994 he headed the Lillehammer Olympic Organising Committee (LOOC). In 1994 he was hired as CEO for NSB Gardermobanen; the next year he was promoted to become CEO in the Norwegian State Railways. In 1996 the Norwegian State Railways was demerged to create two entities; Norges Statsbaner and the Norwegian National Rail Administration. Ueland was the director of both, leaving the National Rail Administration in 1999. He was then fired after heavy criticism related to his leadership of NSB in 2000.

References

1947 births
Living people
Norwegian sports executives and administrators
Norwegian State Railways people
Directors of government agencies of Norway
Norwegian National Rail Administration people
Norwegian State Railways (1883–1996) people